The Chicamacomico River is a  river in southern Maryland in the United States.

See also
List of rivers in Maryland

References

Chesapeake Bay watershed
Rivers of Maryland
Rivers of Dorchester County, Maryland